The El Fenix was a Spanish automobile manufactured from 1901 until 1904.  A product of Barcelona, it was built by Domingo Tamaro Y Roig, who had worked with La Cuadra; he built a few twin-cylinders with gas engines under this name before joining Turcat-Méry in 1904.

References
David Burgess Wise, The New Illustrated Encyclopedia of Automobiles.

Defunct motor vehicle manufacturers of Spain
Companies based in Barcelona